A variety of films and television programmes based on Alice's Adventures in Wonderland (1865) and its sequel Through the Looking-Glass, and What Alice Found There (1871) by Lewis Carroll have been created. 
The following is a list of close adaptations, including sequels or original works set in the same universe:

Films

Theatrical films

Direct-to-video

Television

See also
 Alice in Wonderland (musical) - authorized production first performed in 1886
 Wonder.land (musical) - contemporary retelling of the Alice in Wonderland story. Staged by National Theatre artistic director Rufus Norris, scriptwriter Moira Buffini and score Damon Albarn (2015)

References

Works cited
 
 
 

 
 
Films about size change
Television series about size change

pl:Alicja (film 1980)